The Tennant Company (TNC:NYQ) is a company with about 4000 employees that provides cleaning products. It is a company that is listed in the New York Stock Exchange.

Background
Tennant's products are used to clean and coat surfaces. The Company operates through the following operating segments: North America, Latin America, Europe, Middle East, Africa, and Asia Pacific.

The company was founded in Minneapolis by George H. Tennant as a wood-working business in 1870. It was incorporated in 1909.

Tennant is the U.S. market leader in cleaning equipment.

In 2017, Tennant announced the acquisition of IPC Group, a company based in Italy manufacturing cleaning machines.

In, 2018, Tennant launched their first fully-autonomous scrubber powered by the Brain Corp. AI Operating System.

As of January, 2022, the Tennant Company is the world's largest manufacturer of autonomous mobile robots with over 5,300 units deployed across the world.

References 

Companies listed on the New York Stock Exchange